Cathedral of St John The Evangelist is the Mother Church of the Roman Catholic Archdiocese of Kuala Lumpur and the seat of its Archbishop, Julian Leow Beng Kim.  The first Church on a nearby site was established in 1883, and consisted of a long wooden hall with a few windows built on a forested area of Bukit Nanas, and was dedicated to St John the Evangelist. It was later rebuilt with bricks walls and tile roofed, and today is used as The Community Services Centre". The current building was built in 1954 and completed in 1955 and consecrated in 1962, when it was also elevated to the status of cathedral. The building is known for its whitewashed exterior and twin spires at the west front. It also includes stained glass windows from Paris, depicting scenes from the Gospel.

The parish has come a long way from its early days, from being a parish of expatriates and Eurasians, and is now a thriving 'Cosmopolitan' parish.  Situated in the heart of the Kuala Lumpur, the Cathedral also draws many foreign visitors and diplomats, apart from the regular parishioners, to its Sunday services.

St John's Cathedral is located next to St. John's Institution, which is known for its Grecian-Spanish architecture. The school derives its name from St John Baptist De La Salle and was established by the Lasallian Brothers.

Due to its location ascending Bukit Nanas, it is also in close proximity to Convent Bukit Nanas, Bukit Nanas Forest Reserve and Kuala Lumpur Tower.

2023 ceiling collapse 
On the 10th of February 2023 around 2:30pm, a part of ceiling collapsed on one side of the cathedral. 

Upon inspection, the affected area was a victim of termite infestation. Because of the collapse, there where some damages to thealtar area and a few pews.

Parish Priest Rev. Father Gerard Theraviam has announced that masses will be suspended at the cathedral and will transfer all masses to St. John's Institution until further notice.

Cathedral Building is closed to the public until works are completed

Transportation
It is accessible from the Masjid Jamek LRT station and the Bukit Nanas Monorail station.

See also
 Christianity in Malaysia

References

External links

 Archdiocese of Kuala Lumpur website

Roman Catholic churches completed in 1883
19th-century Roman Catholic church buildings in Malaysia
Churches in Kuala Lumpur
Cathedrals in Malaysia
Roman Catholic cathedrals in Malaysia